The following is a list of ecoregions in Mali, according to the Worldwide Fund for Nature (WWF).

Terrestrial ecoregions
By major habitat type:

Tropical and subtropical grasslands, savannas, and shrublands

Sahelian Acacia savanna
West Sudanian savanna

Flooded grasslands and savannas
Inner Niger Delta flooded savanna

Deserts and xeric shrublands
Sahara desert
South Saharan steppe and woodlands
West Saharan montane xeric woodlands

Freshwater ecoregions
By bioregion:

Nilo-Sudan
Dry Sahel
Upper Niger
Inner Niger Delta
Lower Niger-Benue
Senegal-Gambia
Volta

References
 Burgess, Neil, Jennifer D’Amico Hales, Emma Underwood (2004). Terrestrial Ecoregions of Africa and Madagascar: A Conservation Assessment. Island Press, Washington DC.
 Spalding, Mark D., Helen E. Fox, Gerald R. Allen, Nick Davidson et al. "Marine Ecoregions of the World: A Bioregionalization of Coastal and Shelf Areas". Bioscience Vol. 57 No. 7, July/August 2007, pp. 573–583. 
 Thieme, Michelle L. (2005). Freshwater Ecoregions of Africa and Madagascar: A Conservation Assessment. Island Press, Washington DC.

 
Mali
ecoregions